Idan Dahan (born 7 March, 2001), is an Israeli professional football player who plays as a forward for Hapoel Ashdod.

References

External links

2001 births
Living people
Israeli footballers
Association football forwards
F.C. Ashdod players
Hapoel Ashdod F.C. players
Israeli Premier League players
Liga Leumit players
Footballers from Ashdod